Bonheur Mugisha is a Rwandan footballer who currently plays for Rwanda Premier League club APR and the Rwanda national team.

Club career
Mugisha joined the Heroes Football Academy located in Mayange in the Bugesera District at age 15. By age 17 he was promoted to the first team which played in the Second Division. In 2019 he helped the club earn promotion to the Rwanda Premier League. The club was relegated back to the Second Division after one season and Mugisha joined Mukura Victory Sports on loan for the 2020–21 campaign.  In July 2021 Mugisha joined Rwanda Premier League club APR on a 2-year contract. In August 2021 Mugisha appeared in a friendly against AS Maniema Union of the Democratic Republic of the Congo in preparation for APR's fixtures in 2021–22 CAF Champions League qualifying. After defeating Mogadishu City Club in the First Round, APR fell to Étoile Sportive du Sahel of Tunisia 1–5 with Mugisha playing both legs of the Second Round series.

International career
Mugisha was invited to join the national under-23 team in summer 2021 but did not because of the ongoing COVID-19 pandemic. In January 2022 he received his first call-up to the senior team for a pair of friendlies against Guinea. He made his senior international debut in the first match on 3 January 2022 and went on to appear in both fixtures.

International career statistics

References

External links
National Football Teams profile
Soccerway profile
APR FC profile

Living people
Rwandan footballers
Rwanda international footballers
Association football midfielders
APR F.C. players
2000 births